The 2017 World Women's Snooker Championship was a women's snooker tournament that took place at the Lagoon Billiard Room in Toa Payoh, Singapore, from 13 to 19 March 2017. The event was the 2017 edition of the World Women's Snooker Championship first held in 1976. The event was won by Hong Kong's Ng On-yee, who defeated Vidya Pillai in the final 6–5. Playing time in the final was 8 hours and 4 minutes, making it the longest recorded best-of-11- match, surpassing the previous record of 7 hours and 14 minutes set at the 1992 UK Championship.

The event featured a total prize fund of £15,000, with the winner receiving £5,000. On-yee scored the highest break of the tournament, a 76. The competition was sponsored by Eden Resources.

Background
The tournament was held at the Lagoon Billiard Room in Toa Payoh, Singapore, the first time in more than 20 years that the women's championship had been held outside the United Kingdom. Entry was on an invitational basis, with 32 players, from ten different countries competing. The competition was sponsored by Eden Resources.

The event featured eight groups of four players, with the top two players from each group progressing. The event was split after the group stage, with players not reaching the main knockout tournament competing in a parallel tournament named the "Challenge Cup". Matches were played as best-of-five frames in the group stage, increasing in each round up to the final which was played as a best-of-11-frames match.

Seeding
There were eight seeded players for the tournament, determined by rankings following the 2017 Connie Gough Tournament held in February 2017, who were drawn into separate groups. The seeded players were:

Tournament summary

Early stages
The event began on 13 March with the group stages, featuring eight groups of four players, the top two players progressing from each group. Group stage matches were all played as best-of-five- matches, with dead frames being played. Reanne Evans won all 15 frames across her three matches, whilst both Katrina Wan and Rebecca Kenna won 14 frames each, losing just one.

In the semi-finals, Ng On-yee came back from 60 points down in the deciding frame to beat defending champion Reanne Evans 5–4. Vidya Pillai defeated Rebecca Kenna 5–1 to become the first championship finalist ever from India.

On her way to the final, Pillai defeated four of the eight seeded players – Maria Catalano in the group stage, then Tatjana Vasiljeva, Katrina Wan, and Kenna in the knockouts. On-yee against Pillai was the first all-Asian final in the history of the championship.

The semi-finals started at 10:00 am local time on Sunday, 19 March, with the final scheduled for the afternoon. On-yee had a break of only 30 minutes after her semi-final win before starting what turned out to be a lengthy final commencing at 16:00 pm.

Final
The final was played on 19 March 2019, as a best-of-11-frames match. On-yee won the first two frames before losing the next four. She then won the next three to lead 5–4, before Pillai won the tenth to take the match to the deciding frame.

The deciding frame lasted over an hour. With just pink and black balls left, and the pink lying close to the black, which was itself very close to one of the corner , On-yee fouled and left a free ball. Pillai, four points behind,  the black but  and hit the pink instead, also  the black. On-yee then potted the pink ball to take the frame 66–50 and gain her second world title, having also won in 2015.

The playing time in the final was 8 hours and 4 minutes; it was the longest 11-frame competitive match in snooker, significantly exceeding the previous record of 7 hours and 14 minutes taken by Paul Tanner to defeat Robby Foldvari 6–5 at the 1992 UK Championship. It was the first final to go to the deciding frame in the tournament since 1989, finishing at 1:30 am local time.

Across the semi-final and final, On-yee played for more than 12 hours on the Sunday (and the early part of Monday morning). She received £5,000 for her win. The winner's prize money the previous year, when Reanne Evans won, had been less than a quarter of this.

Breaks
The highest break of the tournament was 76 by On-yee. The second-highest break was scored by On-yee and Evans, who both had a 69. In all, there were only eleven breaks of 50 or over during the groups and knockout stage.

Tournament results

Group stage
The top two players from each of the groups progressed into the knockout draw, where they were seeded based on group stage results. Progression from the group stages was determined, in order, by: Matches won; Head to head results; Frames won; Highest break; and Ranking position.

Knockout 
Source: WPBSA Tournament Manager.
Players listed in bold indicate match winner.

Challenge cup
The challenge cup was a competition for players who did not reach the main knockout draw. It was won by Amee Kamani. The highest break was 90 by Nutcharut Wongharuthai in her match against Neelam Mittal. Players listed in bold indicate match winners.

References

External links
Ng On Yee (Hong Kong) vs Vidya Pillai (India)  2017 Eden World Women’s Snooker Championship final (Sport Singapore video)

World Women's Snooker Championship
International sports competitions hosted by Singapore
World Women's Championship
World Women's Snooker Championship
World Snooker Championship
World Women's Snooker Championship